The Las Vegas Historical Society was created in 2013 to collect, archive, and display photographs of Las Vegas and the Las Vegas Valley in Nevada, which have not yet been publicly showcased.  

Online
The Society's website has an online photo archive organized by decade. The website also allows for local Las Vegans and the city's visitors to upload their historical photographs.

Museum
The Society is located in the Las Vegas Arts District in Downtown Las Vegas. It is open daily for viewing of select photos, put in chronological order by decades to create a timeline for the history of Las Vegas and the Las Vegas Valley in Clark County.

See also

References

External links
 

Historical societies in Nevada
History of Las Vegas
Museums in Las Vegas
History museums in Nevada
Downtown Las Vegas
Las Vegas Valley
2013 establishments in Nevada